This page consists of all current and former members of the Japanese girl group Morning Musume. The group is known for their ever-fluctuating line-up, with "graduations" and auditions held nearly every year.

Current members

Ninth generation (2011)
 Mizuki Fukumura (譜久村聖), will graduate Autumn 2023 
 Erina Ikuta (生田衣梨奈)

Tenth generation (2011)

Eleventh generation (2012)

Twelfth generation (2014)

Thirteenth generation (2016)

Fifteenth generation (2019)

Sixteenth generation (2022)

Former members

First generation (1997)
 Yuko Nakazawa 
 Aya Ishiguro 
 Kaori Iida 
 Natsumi Abe 
 Asuka Fukuda

Second generation (1998)
 Kei Yasuda 
 Mari Yaguchi 
 Sayaka Ichii

Third generation (1999)
 Maki Goto

Fourth generation (2000)
 Rika Ishikawa 
 Hitomi Yoshizawa 
 Nozomi Tsuji 
 Ai Kago

Fifth generation (2001)
 Ai Takahashi 
 Asami Konno 
 Makoto Ogawa 
 Risa Niigaki

Sixth generation (2003)
 Miki Fujimoto 
 Eri Kamei 
 Sayumi Michishige 
 Reina Tanaka

Seventh generation (2005)
 Koharu Kusumi

Eighth generation (2006/2007)
 Aika Mitsui 
 Jun Jun 
 Lin Lin

Ninth generation (2011)
 Riho Sayashi 
 Kanon Suzuki

Tenth generation (2011)
 Haruna Iikubo 
 Masaki Satō 
 Haruka Kudō

Twelfth generation (2014)
 Haruna Ogata

Thirteenth generation (2016)

Fourteenth generation (2017)
 Chisaki Morito

Leadership
Morning Musume contains a leader and a sub-leader role, which consists of providing moral support to the group. The sub-leader position was established on April 16, 2001, when Kaori Iida became the second leader.

Leaders

Sub-leaders

See also
 Hello Pro Kenshūsei

References

Members
Morning Musume
Morning Musume
Morning Musume